The United States Army's 3rd Cavalry Division was created from the perceived need for additional cavalry units in the interwar period.

The 3rd Cavalry Division was largely a "paper" formation existing from 1927 to 1940. Its units never assembled in a single location or conducted large scale training.  It was constituted in the Regular Army but most of the support elements were "Regular Army Inactive" (RAI) units manned with Organized Reserve personnel. The 3rd Cavalry Division never deployed overseas. The Division was disbanded on 10 October 1940.

History

The 3rd Cavalry Division was constituted in the Regular Army on 15 August 1927, allotted to the Fourth, Sixth, Seventh, and Eighth Corps Areas, and assigned to the Second Army. The division was reassigned to the General Headquarters Reserve (GHQR) as a result of the US Army reorganization of 1933. The 3rd Cavalry Division's designated mobilization station was Fort Des Moines, Iowa, where many of the division’s units were organized with Reserve officers as RAI units and where most of them conducted their annual summer training camps. The 3rd Cavalry Division consisted largely of RAI units though many of the units of the division were active during the period 1921–40. Unlike the 2nd Cavalry Division, the division’s active units were not concentrated in one or two areas, but were spread from coast to coast. The active elements of the division in the 1920s and 1930s consisted only of the cavalry regiments; the remainder of the units were to be activated from the RAI units in the Organized Reserve. Like the 2nd Cavalry Division, however, RAI units of the 3rd Cavalry Division were predominantly located in the Seventh Corps Area with most being initially concentrated in the Kansas City metropolitan area. These units conducted their summer training at Fort Riley, Kansas and were under the peacetime control of the HQ, 66th Cavalry Division for administrative and training purposes. In 1933, several of the division’s RAI units were transferred to the Third Corps Area, but by the late 1930s, most of the division’s RAI units were relocated to Des Moines, Iowa.

Organization (1927–33)
 Headquarters & Headquarters Troop 
 5th Cavalry Brigade
 10th Cavalry Regiment (assigned 1927–40) 
 11th Cavalry Regiment (assigned 1927–33)
 5th Machine Gun Squadron
 6th Cavalry Brigade
 3rd Cavalry Regiment (assigned 1927–39) 
 6th Cavalry Regiment (assigned 1927–39) 
 6th Machine Gun Squadron 
 Headquarters, Special Troops
 Headquarters Troop
 3rd Signal Troop
 16th Ordnance Company
 13th Tank Company
 84th Field Artillery Battalion
 12th Engineer Battalion
 3rd Medical Squadron
 3rd Cavalry Division Train, Quartermaster Corps
 44th Observation Squadron

Organization (1933–40)
 Headquarters & Headquarters Troop
 5th Cavalry Brigade
 9th Cavalry Regiment (reassigned to 2nd Cavalry Division 1939)
 10th Cavalry Regiment (reassigned to 2nd Cavalry Division 1940)
 6th Cavalry Brigade
 3rd Cavalry Regiment (converted to a non-divisional mechanized unit 21 February 1942 ) 
 6th Cavalry Regiment (converted to a non-divisional mechanized unit 1939)
 6th Machine Gun Squadron 
 Headquarters, Special Troops
 Headquarters Troop
 3rd Signal Troop
 16th Ordnance Company
 13th Tank Company
 3rd Reconnaissance Squadron
 84th Field Artillery Battalion
 12th Engineer Battalion
 3rd Medical Squadron
 18th Quartermaster Squadron

See also
Formations of the United States Army
 List of armored regiments of the United States Army

References

03
Military units and formations disestablished in 1927
Military units and formations disestablished in 1940